The New England Nightmare is a now-defunct women's tackle football team. They began play in 2010, as a member of the Women's Football Alliance. Based in Windsor, Connecticut, the Nightmare played their home games at Dillon Stadium in Hartford Connecticut and Falcon Field in nearby Meriden.

Season-by-season

|-
|2010 || 2 || 6 || 0 || 2nd National Northeast || --
|-
|2011 || 0 || 8 || 0 || 4th National North || --
|-
|2012 || 3 || 5 || 0 || 2nd National Division 1 || --
|-
!Totals || 5 || 19 || 0

2012 roster

2010

Season schedule

2011

Standings

Season schedule

2012

Standings

Season schedule

External links 
New England Nightmare website

Women's Football Alliance teams
American football teams in Connecticut
Sports in New Haven, Connecticut
American football teams established in 2010
American football teams in the New York metropolitan area
2010 establishments in Connecticut